Orientalist may refer to:
A scholar of Oriental studies
A person or thing relating to the Western intellectual or artistic paradigm known as Orientalism 
The Orientalist, a biography of author Lev Nussimbaum by Tom Reiss

See also
Occidentalist (disambiguation)